Utricularia multicaulis is a very small annual carnivorous plant that belongs to the genus Utricularia. It is native to Bhutan, Burma, China, India, and Nepal. It was originally described by Daniel Oliver in 1859.

See also 
 List of Utricularia species

References 

multicaulis
Flora of Myanmar
Flora of China
Flora of East Himalaya
Flora of Nepal
Carnivorous plants of Asia
Plants described in 1859
Taxa named by Daniel Oliver